Kim Chung-yul (29 September 1917 – 7 September 1992) was the South Korean Air Force officer who served as Prime Minister of South Korea from July 1987 to February 1988.

Personal life 
He was born on 29 September 1917. He was South Korean Ambassador to United States and National Defence Minister. He served in the Korean Air Force during World War II. On 7 September 1992, he died after a lengthy illness. His native city was Seoul.

References 

Prime Ministers of South Korea
1917 births
1992 deaths
People from Seoul
Republic of Korea Air Force personnel
Military personnel of World War II
South Korean aviators